Rutherford "Ruddy" Cravens is an American actor who primarily works on stage. He has been in three Oscar-winning films: Ray (2004), No Country for Old Men (2007), and Get Out (2017). Rutherford Cravens appears annually in the Houston Shakespeare Festival.

Filmography

External links
Rutherford Cravens at Pastorini-Bosby Talent Agency

Year of birth missing (living people)
Living people
American male actors